Sybra alternans is a species of beetle in the family Cerambycidae. It was described by Wiedemann in 1823. It is known from Myanmar, Thailand, Laos, Cambodia, Vietnam, Malaysia, Taiwan, Indonesia, Mariana Islands, Caroline Islands, Marshall Islands, and the Philippines. It was introduced in Hawaii in 1917, as well as Florida. Its diet includes plants such as Ananas comosus, Canavalia ensiformis, Musa × paradisiaca, Ocimum basilicum, Phaseolus vulgaris, Pittosporum tobira, Vachellia farnesiana, and Xanthium strumarium.

References

alternans
Beetles described in 1823